Antoine Berlin (born 2 August 1989) is a Monegasque professional racing cyclist and former long-distance runner, who currently rides for UCI Continental team .

Career

Athletics
Before cycling, Berlin competed as a long-distance runner for AS Monaco. He holds the Monegasque national records for the 1000 metres, 10,000 metres, 10 km road race and the half marathon. He also competed in the 1500 metres at the 2009 World Championships in Athletics. In 2010, he moved to the United States to compete for East Carolina University, however his training was hindered by injuries.

In 2016, he retired from running after being unable to qualify for the 2016 Summer Olympics due to a pelvic stress fracture.

Cycling
Berlin took up cycling in May 2017 with the Magnan Bornala Cyclisme team in Nice. In 2020, he turned professional with UCI Continental team  at the age of 30. After the team folded at the end of the season, he joined  in March 2021. With this team, he notably placed 13th at the Vuelta a Murcia and 8th overall Le Tour de Savoie Mont Blanc. In 2022, he transferred to French team , for their first season at the UCI Continental level.

Personal bests
Outdoor
1000 metres – 2:35.70 (Monaco 2008) NR
1500 metres – 4:04.55 (Villefranche-sur-Saone 2008) NU20R
3000 metres – 8:46.26 (Nice 2008) NU20R
5000 metres – 	15:19.87 (Vénissieux 2008) NU20R
10,000 metres – 32:00.76 (Philadelphia 2010) NR

Indoor
3000 metres – 	8:48.03 (Reims 2011) NR
5000 metres – 	15:32.85 (Newport News 2010)

Road
10km 30:30 (Lausanne 2008) NR
Half marathon – 1:08:57 (Paris 2009) NR

Major results
2021
 8th Overall Le Tour de Savoie Mont Blanc

References

External links
 

1989 births
Living people
Monegasque male cyclists
Monegasque male long-distance runners